The Barlow House, on Danville Rd. in Garrard County, Kentucky, near Lancaster, is a Greek Revival-style house built c.1850.  It was listed on the National Register of Historic Places in 1985.

It is a two-story three-bay frame and log house.  It was deemed "One of the county's best examples of the mid 19th
century I-houses related to agricultural development."

References

Houses on the National Register of Historic Places in Kentucky
Greek Revival houses in Kentucky
Houses completed in 1850
Houses in Garrard County, Kentucky
I-houses in Kentucky
National Register of Historic Places in Garrard County, Kentucky
Log buildings and structures on the National Register of Historic Places in Kentucky
Log houses in the United States
1850 establishments in Kentucky